"You'll Never Know" is a song written by Kim Richey and Angelo Petraglia, and recorded by Richey for her 1995 debut album Kim Richey. The song was later recorded by Mindy McCready for her 1997 album If I Don't Stay the Night. McCready's version was released as a single on January 20, 1998 and reached number 19 on the Billboard Hot Country Singles & Tracks chart.

Content
The song examines the emotions of a woman who is determined to maintain her emotions after a break up.

Critical reception
Deborah Evans Price, of Billboard magazine reviewed the song favorably, saying that it shows her "maturation as a vocalist." She goes on to call the song "well-written."

Music video
The music video was directed by Dean Cain and premiered in 1998.

Chart performance
"You'll Never Know" debuted at number 52 on the U.S. Billboard Hot Country Singles & Tracks for the week of January 17, 1998. It eventually peaked at #19, becoming McCready's last Top 20 hit.

Year-end charts

References

1995 songs
1998 singles
Mindy McCready songs
Songs written by Kim Richey
Song recordings produced by David Malloy
BNA Records singles
Songs written by Angelo Petraglia